The 1985 WCT Tournament of Champions was a men's tennis tournament played on outdoor clay courts in Forest Hills, Queens, New York City in the United States. The event was part of the Super Series of the 1985 Grand Prix circuit and was organized by World Championship Tennis (WCT). It was the ninth edition of the tournament and was held from May 6 through May 12, 1985. No.2 seeded Ivan Lendl won the singles title, his second at the event after 1982.

Finals

Singles
 Ivan Lendl defeated  John McEnroe 6–3, 6–3
 It was Lendl's 4th singles title of the year and the 46th of his career.

Doubles
 Ken Flach /  Robert Seguso defeated  Givaldo Barbosa /  Ivan Kley 7–5, 6–2

See also
 Lendl–McEnroe rivalry

References

External links
 International Tennis Federation – tournament edition details

1985 Grand Prix (tennis)
World Championship Tennis Tournament of Champions
WCT Tournament of Champions
WCT Tournament of Champions